CMLA may refer to:

 Canadian Music Library Association, now the Canadian Association of Music Libraries, Archives and Documentation Centres
 Chief Martial Law Administrator
 Collegiate Middle Level Association